The Agence de l'innovation industrielle was a French governmental agency created in 2005 to support technological projects. As of 2006, it was supporting seven projects:

BioHub, a chemistry projects to create products with cereals, without using oil
HOMES, a project of housing with ultra-low use of energy
 Nanosmart, a project of substrate
Quaero, a search engine
TVMSL, a project of creating a standard of hybrid terrestrial and satellite mobile television based on DVB-H
NeoVal, a small automated subway system to replace the VAL
 VHD (Hybrid Diesel Vehicle), which involves PSA Peugeot Citroën.

The agency was headed by Jean-Louis Beffa and Robert Havas. In January 2008, the French government decided to merge the agency with the French small and medium enterprises support public agency, OSEO.

External links
Official web site
The six projects
VHD and Nanosmart
Chirac unveils his grand plan to restore French pride 

Government agencies of France
Research and development organizations
Government agencies established in 2005